Liu Chih-Pin is a Taiwanese admiral who is currently the Chief of the Naval Staff of the Republic of China Navy. He previously served as deputy Chief of the General Staff. From 2 January to 15 January 2020, he served as acting Chief of the General Staff due to the demise of then Chief of the General Staff Shen Yi-ming. Prior to being deputy Chief of the General Staff, he was Navy Chief of Staff and also deputy commander of the navy. He graduated from ROC Naval Academy, National Defense University, Naval Command and Staff College and Taiwan War College.

He was also head of Navy's 124th Flotilla, chief of staff of the Navy Fleet Command and deputy chief of naval staff.

Notes 

1962 births
Living people
Republic of China Navy admirals